Reginald "Reggie" Jagers III (born August 28, 1994) is an American athlete specializing in the discus throw. He won the gold medal at the 2017 Summer Universiade.

In 2019, he won the bronze medal at Pan American Games in Lima, Peru.

He has qualified to represent the United States at the 2020 Summer Olympics.

International competitions

References

Living people
Universiade gold medalists for the United States
1994 births
American male discus throwers
Universiade medalists in athletics (track and field)
Pan American Games medalists in athletics (track and field)
Pan American Games bronze medalists for the United States
Athletes (track and field) at the 2019 Pan American Games
Medalists at the 2017 Summer Universiade
Medalists at the 2019 Pan American Games
Track and field athletes from Cleveland
Athletes (track and field) at the 2020 Summer Olympics
Kent State Golden Flashes men's track and field athletes
Olympic track and field athletes of the United States